Mosasaurus ("lizard of the Meuse River") is the type genus (defining example) of the mosasaurs, an extinct group of aquatic squamate reptiles. It lived from about 82 to 66 million years ago during the Campanian and Maastrichtian stages of the Late Cretaceous. The earliest fossils of Mosasaurus known to science were found as skulls in a chalk quarry near the Dutch city of Maastricht in the late 18th century, which were initially thought to have been the bones of crocodiles or whales. One skull discovered around 1780, which was seized by France during the French Revolutionary Wars for its scientific value, was famously nicknamed the "great animal of Maastricht". In 1808, naturalist Georges Cuvier concluded that it belonged to a giant marine lizard with similarities to monitor lizards but otherwise unlike any known living animal. This concept was revolutionary at the time and helped support the then-developing ideas of extinction. Cuvier did not designate a scientific name for the new animal, and this was done by William Daniel Conybeare in 1822 when he named it Mosasaurus in reference to its origin in fossil deposits near the Meuse River. The exact affinities of Mosasaurus as a squamate remain controversial, and scientists continue to debate whether its closest living relatives are monitor lizards or snakes.

The skull of Mosasaurus was equipped with robust jaws capable of swinging back and forth and strong muscles capable of powerful bites using dozens of large teeth adapted for cutting prey. Its four limbs were shaped into robust paddles to steer the animal underwater. Its tail was long and ended in a downward bend and a paddle-like fluke. Mosasaurus was a predator possessing excellent vision to compensate for its poor sense of smell, and a high metabolic rate suggesting it was endothermic ("warm-blooded"), an adaptation only found in mosasaurs among squamates. There is considerable morphological variability across the currently-recognized species in Mosasaurus—from the robustly-built M. hoffmannii to the slender and serpentine M. lemonnieri—but an unclear diagnosis (description of distinguishing features) of the type species M. hoffmannii led to a historically problematic classification. As a result, more than fifty different species have been attributed to the genus in the past. A redescription of the type specimen in 2017 helped resolve the taxonomy issue and confirmed at least five species to be within the genus. Another five species still nominally classified within Mosasaurus are planned to be reassessed in a future study.

Fossil evidence suggests Mosasaurus inhabited much of the Atlantic Ocean and the seaways adjacent to it. Mosasaurus fossils have been found in places as diverse as North and South America, Europe, Africa, Western Asia, and Antarctica. This distribution encompassed a wide range of oceanic climates including tropical, subtropical, temperate, and subpolar climates. Mosasaurus was a common large predator in these oceans and was positioned at the top of the food chain. Paleontologists believe its diet would have included virtually any animal; it likely preyed on bony fish, sharks, cephalopods, birds, and other marine reptiles including sea turtles and other mosasaurs. It likely preferred to hunt in open water near the surface. From an ecological standpoint, Mosasaurus probably had a profound impact on the structuring of marine ecosystems; its arrival in some locations such as the Western Interior Seaway in North America coincides with a complete turnover of faunal assemblages and diversity. Mosasaurus faced competition with other large predatory mosasaurs such as Prognathodon and Tylosauruswhich were known to feed on similar preythough they were able to coexist in the same ecosystems through niche partitioning. There were still conflicts among them, as an instance of Tylosaurus attacking a Mosasaurus has been documented. Several fossils document deliberate attacks on Mosasaurus individuals by members of the same species. In fighting likely took place in the form of snout grappling, similarly seen in modern crocodiles today.

Research history

Discovery and identification

The first Mosasaurus fossil known to science was discovered in 1764 in a chalk quarry near Maastricht in the Netherlands in the form of a skull, which was initially identified as a whale. Later around 1780, the quarry produced a second skull that caught the attention of the physician Johann Leonard Hoffmann, who thought it was a crocodile. He contacted the prominent biologist Petrus Camper, and the skull gained international attention after Camper published a study identifying it as a whale. This caught the attention of French revolutionaries, who looted the fossil following the capture of Maastricht during the French Revolutionary Wars in 1794. In a 1798 narrative of this event by Barthélemy Faujas de Saint-Fond, the skull was allegedly retrieved by twelve grenadiers in exchange for an offer of 600 bottles of wine. This story helped elevate the fossil into cultural fame, but historians agree that the narrative was exaggerated.

After its seizure, the second skull was sent to the National Museum of Natural History, France in 1795 and later cataloged as MNHN AC 9648. By 1808, Camper's son Adriaan Gilles Camper and Georges Cuvier concluded that the fossil, which by then was nicknamed the "great animal of Maastricht", belonged to a marine lizard with affinities to monitor lizards, but otherwise unlike any modern animal. The skull became part of Cuvier's first speculations about the conception of extinction, which later led to his theory of catastrophism, a precursor to the theory of evolution. At the time, it was not believed that a species could go extinct, and fossils of animals were often interpreted as some form of an extant species. Cuvier's idea that there existed an animal unlike any today was revolutionary at the time, and in 1812 he proclaimed, "Above all, the precise determination of the famous animal from Maastricht seems to us as important for the theory of zoological laws, as for the history of the globe." In a 1822 work by James Parkinson, William Daniel Conybeare coined the genus Mosasaurus from the Latin Mosa "Meuse" and the Ancient Greek σαῦρος (saûros, "lizard"), all literally meaning "lizard of the Meuse", in reference to the river where the holotype specimen was discovered nearby. In 1829, Gideon Mantell added the specific epithet hoffmannii, in honor to Hoffmann. Cuvier later designated the second skull as the new species' holotype (defining example).

Other species

Richard Ellis speculated in 2003 that this may have been the earliest discovery of the second species M. missouriensis, although competing speculations exist. In 1818, a fossil from Monmouth County, New Jersey became the first North American specimen to be correctly recognized as a Mosasaurus by scientists of the time.

The type specimen of M. missouriensis was first described in 1834 by Richard Harlan based on a snout fragment found along the river's Big Bend. He coined the specific epithet and initially identified it as a species of Ichthyosaurus but later as an amphibian. The rest of the skull had been discovered earlier by a fur-trapper, and it eventually came under the possession of prince Maximilian of Weid-Neuwied between 1832 and 1834. The fossil was delivered to Georg August Goldfuss in Bonn for research, who published a study in 1845. The same year, Christian Erich Hermann von Meyer suspected that the skull and Harlan's snout were part of the same individual. This was confirmed in 2004.

The third species was described in 1881 from fragmentary fossils in New Jersey by Edward Drinker Cope, who thought it was a giant species of Clidastes and named it Clidastes conodon. In 1966, it was reidentified as a species of Mosasaurus. In his description, Cope does not provide the etymology for the specific epithet conodon, but it is suggested that it could be a portmanteau meaning "conical tooth", derived from the Ancient Greek κῶνος (kônos, "cone") and ὀδών (odṓn, "tooth"), probably in reference to conical surface teeth smooth of the species.

The fourth species M. lemonnieri was first detected by Camper Jr. based on fossils from his father's collections, which he discussed with Cuvier during their 1799 correspondence, but Cuvier rejected the idea of another Mosasaurus species. This species was re-introduced to science and formally described in 1889 by Louis Dollo based on a skull recovered by Alfred Lemonnier from a phosphate quarry in Belgium. Dollo names the species in his honor. Further mining of the quarry in subsequent years uncovered many additional well-preserved fossils, including multiple partial skeletons which collectively represented nearly the entire skeleton of the species. They were described by Dollo in later papers. Despite being the best anatomically represented species, M. lemonnieri was largely ignored in scientific literature. Theagarten Lingham-Soliar suggested two reasons for this neglect. First, M. lemonnieri fossils are endemic to Belgium and the Netherlands, which despite the famous discovery of the M. hoffmannii holotype attracted little attention from mosasaur paleontologists. Second, the species was overshadowed by the more famous and history-rich type species.

M. lemonnieri is a controversial taxon, and there is debate on whether it is a distinct species or not. In 1967, Dale Russell argued that M. lemonnieri and M. conodon are the same species and designated the former as a junior synonym per the principle of priority. In a 2000 study, Lingham-Soliar refuted this based on a comprehensive study of existing M. lemonnieri specimens, which was corroborated by a study on the M. conodon skull by Takehito Ikejiri and Spencer G. Lucas in 2014. In 2004, Eric Mulder, Dirk Cornelissen, and Louis Verding suggested M. lemonnieri could be a juvenile form of M. hoffmannii based on the argument that significant differences could be explained by age-based variation. However, the need for more research to confirm any hypotheses of synonymy was expressed.

The fifth species M. beaugei was described by Camille Arambourg in 1952 from isolated teeth originating from phosphate deposits in the Oulad Abdoun Basin and the Ganntour Basin in Morocco. The species is named in honor of Alfred Beaugé, director at the time of the OCP Group, who invited Arambourg to participate in the research project and helped him to provide local fossils.

Early depictions

Scientists during the early and mid-1800s initially imagined Mosasaurus as an amphibious marine reptile with webbed feet and limbs for walking. This was based on fossils like the M. missouriensis holotype, which indicated an elastic vertebral column that Goldfuss in 1845 saw as evidence of an ability to walk and interpretations of some phalanges as claws. In 1854, Hermann Schlegel proved how Mosasaurus actually had fully aquatic flippers. He clarified that earlier interpretations of claws were erroneous and demonstrated how the phalanges show no indication of muscle or tendon attachment, which would make walking impossible. They are also broad, flat, and form a paddle. Schlegel's hypothesis was largely ignored by contemporary scientists but became widely accepted by the 1870s when Othniel Charles Marsh and Cope uncovered more complete mosasaur remains in North America.

One of the earliest depictions of Mosasaurus in paleoart is a life-size concrete sculpture created by Benjamin Waterhouse Hawkins between 1852 and 1854 as part of the collection of sculptures of prehistoric animals on display at the Crystal Palace Park in London. The restoration was primarily informed by Richard Owen's interpretation of the M. hoffmannii holotype and the anatomy of monitor lizards, so Hawkins depicted the animal as essentially a water-going monitor lizard. It was given a boxy head, nostrils at the side of the skull, large volumes of soft tissue around the eyes, lips reminiscent of monitor lizards, scales consistent with those in large monitors like the Komodo dragon, and a flipper. The model was deliberately sculpted incomplete, which Mark Witton believed was likely to save time and money. Many elements of the sculpture can be considered inaccurate, even for the time. It did not take into account Golduss' 1845 study of M. missouriensis which instead called for a narrower skull, nostrils at the top of the skull, and amphibious terrestrial limbs (the latter being incorrect in modern standards).

Description

Mosasaurus was a type of derived mosasaur, or a latecoming member with advanced evolutionary traits such as a fully aquatic lifestyle. As such, it had a streamlined body, an elongated tail ending with a downturn supporting a two-lobed fin, and two pairs of flippers. While in the past derived mosasaurs were depicted as akin to giant flippered sea snakes, it is now understood that they were more similar in build to other large marine vertebrates such as ichthyosaurs, marine crocodylomorphs, and archaeocete whales through convergent evolution.

Size

The type species, M. hoffmannii, is one of the largest marine reptiles known, though knowledge of its skeleton remains incomplete as it is mainly known from skulls. Russell (1967) wrote that the length of the jaw equalled one tenth of the body length in the species. No explicit justification for the 1:10 ratio was provided in Russell (1967), and it has been considered to be probably overestimated by Cleary et al. (2018). In 2014, Federico Fanti and colleagues alternatively argued that the total length of M. hoffmannii was more likely closer to seven times the length of the skull, which was based on a near-complete skeleton of the related species Prognathodon overtoni.

Isolated bones suggest some M. hoffmannii may have exceeded the lengths of the Penza specimen. It was not stated whether they applied Russell's 1967 ratio.

M. missouriensis and M. lemonnieri are smaller than M. hoffmannii but are known from more complete fossils. He also measured the dimensions of IRSNB 3119 and recorded that the skull constituted approximately one-eleventh of the whole body. Polcyn et al.

Skull

The skull of Mosasaurus is conical and tapers off to a short snout which extends a little beyond the frontmost teeth. In M. hoffmannii, this snout is blunt, while in M. lemonnieri it is pointed. Above the gum line in both jaws, a single row of small pits known as foramina are lined parallel to the jawline; they are used to hold the terminal branches of jaw nerves. The foramina along the snout form a pattern similar to the foramina in Clidastes skulls. The upper jaws in most species are robustly built, broad, and deep except in M. conodon, where they are slender. The disparity is also reflected in the dentary, the lower jawbone, although all species share a long and straight dentary. In M. hoffmannii, the top margin of the dentary is slightly curved upwards; this is also the case with the largest specimens of M. lemonnieri, although more typical skulls of the species have a near-perfectly straight jawline. The premaxillary bar, the long portion of the premaxillary bone extending behind the premaxillary teeth, is narrow and constricts near the middle in M. hoffmannii and M. lemonnieri like in typical mosasaurs. In M. missouriensis, the bar is robust and does not constrict. The external nares (nostril openings) are moderately sized and measure around 21–24% of the skull's length in M. hoffmannii. They are placed further toward the back of the skull than in nearly all other mosasaurs (exceeded only by Goronyosaurus), and begin above the fourth or fifth maxillary teeth. As a result, the rear portions of the maxilla (the main tooth-bearing bone of the upper jaw) lack the dorsal concavity that would fit the nostrils in typical mosasaurs.

The palate, which consists of the pterygoid bones, palatine bone, and nearby processes of other bones, is tightly packed to provide greater cranial stability. The neurocranium housed a brain which was narrow and relatively small compared to other mosasaurs. For example, the braincase of the mosasaur Plioplatecarpus marshi provided for a brain around twice the size of that in M. hoffmannii despite being only half the length of the latter. Spaces within the braincase for the occipital lobe and cerebral hemisphere are narrow and shallow, suggesting such brain parts were relatively small. The parietal foramen in Mosasaurus, which is associated with the parietal eye, is the smallest among mosasaurids. The quadrate bone, which connected the lower jaw to the rest of the skull and formed the jaw joint, is tall and somewhat rectangular in shape, differing from the rounder quadrates found in typical mosasaurs. The quadrate also housed the hearing structures, with the eardrum residing within a round and concave depression in the outer surface called the tympanic ala. The trachea likely stretched from the esophagus to below the back end of the lower jaw's coronoid process, where it split into smaller pairs of bronchi which extended parallel to each other.

Teeth

The features of teeth in Mosasaurus vary across species, but unifying characteristics include a design specialized for cutting prey, highly prismatic surfaces (enamel circumference shaped by flat sides called prisms), and two opposite cutting edges. Mosasaurus teeth are large and robust except for those in M. conodon and M. lemonnieri, which instead have more slender teeth. The cutting edges of Mosasaurus differ by species. The cutting edges in M. hoffmannii and M. missouriensis are finely serrated, while in M. conodon and M. lemonnieri serrations do not exist. The cutting edges of M. beaugei are neither serrated nor smooth, but instead possess minute wrinkles known as crenulations. The number of prisms in Mosasaurus teeth can slightly vary between tooth types and general patterns differ between speciesM. hoffmannii had two to three prisms on the labial side (the side facing outwards) and no prisms on the lingual side (the side facing the tongue), M. missouriensis had four to six labial prisms and eight lingual prisms, M. lemonnieri had eight to ten labial prisms, and M. beaugei had three to five labial prisms and eight to nine lingual prisms.

Like all mosasaurs, Mosasaurus had four types of teeth, classified based on the jaw bones they were located on. On the upper jaw, there were three types: the premaxillary teeth, maxillary teeth, and pterygoid teeth. On the lower jaw, only one type, the dentary teeth, were present. In each jaw row, from front to back, Mosasaurus had: two premaxillary teeth, twelve to sixteen maxillary teeth, and eight to sixteen pterygoid teeth on the upper jaw and fourteen to seventeen dentary teeth on the lower jaw. The teeth were largely consistent in size and shape with only minor differences throughout the jaws (homodont) except for the smaller pterygoid teeth. The number of teeth in the maxillae, pterygoids, and dentaries vary between species and sometimes even individualsM. hoffmannii had fourteen to sixteen maxillary teeth, fourteen to fifteen dentary teeth, and eight pterygoid teeth; M. missouriensis had fourteen to fifteen maxillary teeth, fourteen to fifteen dentary teeth, and eight to nine pterygoid teeth; M. conodon had fourteen to fifteen maxillary teeth, sixteen to seventeen dentary teeth, and eight pterygoid teeth; M. lemonnieri had fifteen maxillary teeth, fourteen to seventeen dentary teeth, and eleven to twelve pterygoid teeth; and M. beaugei had twelve to thirteen maxillary teeth, fourteen to sixteen dentary teeth, and six or more pterygoid teeth. One indeterminate specimen of Mosasaurus similar to M. conodon from the Pembina Gorge State Recreation Area in North Dakota was found to have an unusual count of sixteen pterygoid teeth, far greater than in known species.

The dentition was thecodont (tooth roots deeply cemented within the jaw bone). Teeth were constantly shed through a process where the replacement tooth developed within the root of the original tooth and then pushed it out of the jaw. This was by observing the von Ebner lines, incremental marks in dentin that form daily. It was approximated that it took the odontoblasts 511 days and dentin 233 days to develop to the extent observed in the tooth.

Postcranial skeleton

One of the most complete Mosasaurus skeletons in terms of vertebral representation (Mosasaurus sp.; SDSM 452) has seven cervical (neck) vertebrae, thirty-eight dorsal vertebrae (which includes thoracic and lumbar vertebrae) in the back, and eight pygal vertebrae (front tail vertebrae lacking haemal arches) followed by sixty-eight caudal vertebrae in the tail. All species of Mosasaurus have seven cervical vertebrae, but other vertebral counts vary among them. Various partial skeletons of M. conodon, M. hoffmannii, and M. missouriensis suggest M. conodon likely had up to thirty-six dorsal vertebrae and nine pygal vertebrae; M. hoffmannii had likely up to thirty-two dorsal vertebrae and ten pygal vertebrae; and M. missouriensis around thirty-three dorsal vertebrae, eleven pygal vertebrae, and at least seventy-nine caudal vertebrae. M. lemmonieri had the most vertebrae in the genus, with up to around forty dorsal vertebrae, twenty-two pygal vertebrae, and ninety caudal vertebrae. Compared to other mosasaurs, the rib cage of Mosasaurus is unusually deep and forms an almost perfect semicircle, giving it a barrel-shaped chest. Rather than being fused together, extensive cartilage likely connected the ribs with the sternum, which would have facilitated breathing movements and compression when in deeper waters. The texture of the bones is virtually identical with in modern whales, which indicates Mosasaurus possessed a high range of aquatic adaptation and neutral buoyancy as seen in cetaceans.

The tail structure of Mosasaurus is similar to relatives like Prognathodon, in which soft tissue evidence for a two-lobed tail is known. The tail vertebrae gradually shorten around the center of the tail and lengthen behind the center, suggesting rigidness around the tail center and excellent flexibility behind it. Like most advanced mosasaurs, the tail bends slightly downwards as it approached the center, but this bend is offset from the dorsal plane at a small degree. Mosasaurus also has large haemal arches located at the bottom of each caudal vertebra which bend near the middle of the tail, which contrasts with the reduction of haemal arches in other marine reptiles such as ichthyosaurs. These and other features support a large and powerful paddle-like fluke in Mosasaurus.

The forelimbs of Mosasaurus are wide and robust. The scapula and humerus are fan-shaped and wider than tall. The radius and ulna are short, but the former is taller and larger than the latter. The ilium is rod-like and slender; in M. missouriensis, it is around 1.5 times longer than the femur. The femur itself is about twice as long as it is wide and ends at the distal side in a pair of distinct articular facets (of which one connects to the ilium and the other to the paddle bones) that meet at an angle of approximately 120°. Five sets of metacarpals and phalanges (finger bones) were encased in and supported the paddles, with the fifth set being shorter and offset from the rest. The overall structure of the paddle is compressed, similar to in Plotosaurus, and was well-suited for faster swimming. In the hindlimbs, the paddle is supported by four sets of digits.

Interactive skeletal reconstruction of M. hoffmannii

(hover over or click on each skeletal component to identify the structure)

Classification

History of taxonomy

Because nomenclatural rules were not well-defined at the time, 19th century scientists did not give Mosasaurus a proper diagnosis during its initial descriptions, which led to ambiguity in how the genus is defined. This led Mosasaurus to become a wastebasket taxon containing as many as fifty different species. A 2017 study by Hallie Street and Michael Caldwell performed the first proper diagnosis and description of the M. hoffmannii holotype, which allowed a major taxonomic cleanup confirming five species as likely validM. hoffmannii, M. missouriensis, M. conodon, M. lemonnieri, and M. beaugei. The study also held four additional species from Pacific depositsM. mokoroa, M. hobetsuensis, M. flemingi, and M. prismaticusto be possibly valid, pending a future formal reassessment. Street & Caldwell (2017) was derived from Street's 2016 doctoral thesis, which contained a phylogenetic study proposing the constraining of Mosasaurus into four speciesM. hoffmannii, M. missouriensis, M. lemonnieri, and a proposed new species M. glycyswith M. conodon and the Pacific taxa belonging to different genera and M. beaugei being a synonym of M. hoffmannii.

Systematics and evolution

As the type genus of the family Mosasauridae and the subfamily Mosasaurinae, Mosasaurus is a member of the order Squamata (which comprises lizards and snakes). Relationships between mosasaurs and living squamates remain controversial as scientists still fiercely debate on whether the closest living relatives of mosasaurs are monitor lizards or snakes. Mosasaurus, along with mosasaur genera Eremiasaurus, Plotosaurus, and Moanasaurus traditionally form a tribe within the Mosasaurinae variously called Mosasaurini or Plotosaurini.

Phylogeny and evolution of the genus

One of the earliest relevant attempts at an evolutionary study of Mosasaurus was done by Russell in 1967. He proposed that Mosasaurus evolved from a Clidastes-like mosasaur, and diverged into two lineages, one giving rise to M. conodon and another siring a chronospecies sequence which contained in order of succession M. ivoensis, M. missouriensis, and M. maximus-hoffmanni. However, Russell used an early method of phylogenetics and did not use cladistics.

In 1997, Bell published the first cladistical study of North American mosasaurs. Incorporating the species M. missouriensis, M. conodon, M. maximus, and an indeterminate specimen (UNSM 77040), some of his findings agreed with Russell (1967), such as Mosasaurus descending from an ancestral group containing Clidastes and M. conodon being the most basal of the genus. Contrary to Russell (1967), Bell also recovered Mosasaurus in a sister relationship with another group which included Globidens and Prognathodon, and M. maximus as a sister species to Plotosaurus. The latter rendered Mosasaurus paraphyletic (an unnatural grouping), but Bell (1997) nevertheless recognized Plotosaurus as a distinct genus.

Bell's study served as a precedent for later studies that mostly left the systematics of Mosasaurus unchanged, although some later studies have recovered the sister group to Mosasaurus and Plotosaurus to instead be Eremiasaurus or Plesiotylosaurus depending on the method of data interpretation used, with at least one study also recovering M. missouriensis to be the most basal species of the genus instead of M. conodon. In 2014, Konishi and colleagues expressed a number of concerns with the reliance on Bell's study. First, the genus was severely underrepresented by incorporating only the three North American species M. hoffmannii/M. maximus, M. missouriensis, and M. conodon; by doing so, others like M. lemonnieri, which is one of the most completely known species in the genus, were neglected, which affected phylogenetic results. Second, the studies relied on an unclean and shaky taxonomy of the Mosasaurus genus due to the lack of a clear holotype diagnosis, which may have been behind the genus's paraphyletic status. Third, there was still a lack of comparative studies of the skeletal anatomy of large mosasaurines at the time. These problems were addressed in Street's 2016 thesis in an updated phylogenetic analysis.

Conrad uniquely used only M. hoffmannii and M. lemonnieri in his 2008 phylogenetic analysis, which recovered M. hoffmannii as basal to a multitude of descendant clades containing (in order of most to least basal) Globidens, M. lemonnieri, Goronyosaurus, and Plotosaurus. This result indicated that M. hoffmannii and M. lemonnieri are not in the same genus. However, the study used a method unorthodox to traditional phylogenetic studies on mosasaur species because its focus was on the relationships of entire squamate groups rather than mosasaur classification. As a result, some paleontologists caution that lower-order classification results from Conrad's 2008 study such as the specific placement of Mosasaurus may contain technical problems, making them inaccurate.

The following cladogram on the left (Topology A) is modified from a maximum clade credibility tree inferred by a Bayesian analysis in the most recent major phylogenetic analysis of the Mosasaurinae subfamily by Madzia & Cau (2017), which was self-described as a refinement of a larger study by Simões et al. (2017). The cladogram on the right (Topology B) is modified from Street's 2016 doctoral thesis proposing a revision to the Mosasaurinae, with proposed new taxa and renamings in single quotations.

Paleobiology

Head musculature and mechanics

In 1995, Lingham-Soliar studied the head musculature of M. hoffmannii. Because soft tissue like muscles do not easily fossilize, reconstruction of the musculature was largely based on the structure of the skull, muscle scarring on the skull, and the musculature in extant monitor lizards.

In modern lizards, the mechanical build of the skull is characterized by a four-pivot geometric structure in the cranium that allows flexible movement of the jaws, possibly to allow the animals to better position them and prevent prey escape when hunting. In contrast, the frontal and parietal bones, which in modern lizards connect to form a flexible pivot point, overlap in the skull of M. hoffmannii. This creates a rigid three-pivot geometric cranial structure. These cranial structures are united by strong interlocking sutures formed to resist compression and shear forces caused by a downward thrust of the lower jaw muscles or an upward thrust of prey. This rigid but highly shock-absorbent structure of the cranium likely allowed a powerful bite force.

Like all mosasaurs, the lower jaws of Mosasaurus could swing forward and backward. In many mosasaurs like Prognathodon and M. lemonnieri, this function mainly served to allow ratchet feeding, in which the pterygoid and jaws would "walk" captured prey into the mouth like a conveyor belt. But especially compared to those in M. lemonnieri, the pterygoid teeth in M. hoffmannii are relatively small, which indicates ratchet feeding was relatively unimportant to its hunting and feeding. Rather, M. hoffmannii likely employed inertial feeding (in which the animal thrusts its head and neck backward to release a held prey item and immediately thrust the head and neck forward to close the jaws around the item) and used jaw adduction to assist in biting during prey seizure. The magnus adductor muscles, which attach to the lower jaws to the cranium and have a major role in biting function, are massive, indicating M. hoffmannii was capable of enormous bite forces. The long, narrow, and heavy nature of the lower jaws and attachment of tendons at the coronoid process would have allowed quick opening and closing of the mouth with little energy input underwater, which also contributed to the powerful bite force of M. hoffmannii and suggests it would not have needed the strong magnus depressor muscles (jaw-opening muscles) seen in some plesiosaurs.

Mobility and thermoregulation

Mosasaurus swam using its tail. The swimming style was likely sub-carangiform, which is exemplified today by mackerels. Its elongated paddle-like limbs functioned as hydrofoils for maneuvering the animal. The paddles' steering function was enabled by large muscle attachments from the outwards-facing side of the humerus to the radius and ulna and modified joints allowed an enhanced ability of rotating the flippers. The powerful forces resulting from utilization of the paddles may have sometimes resulted in bone damage, as evidenced by a M. hoffmannii ilium with significant separation of the bone's head from the rest of the bone likely caused by frequent shearing forces at the articulation joint.

The tissue structure of Mosasaurus bones suggests it had a metabolic rate much higher than modern squamates and its resting metabolic rate was between that of the leatherback sea turtle and that of ichthyosaurs and plesiosaurs. Mosasaurus was likely endothermic and maintained a constant body temperature independent of the external environment. Although there is no direct evidence specific to the genus, studies on the biochemistry of related mosasaur genera such as Clidastes suggests that endothermy was likely present in all mosasaurs. Such a trait is unique among squamates, the only known exception being the Argentine black and white tegu, which can maintain partial endothermy. This adaptation would have given several advantages to Mosasaurus, including increased stamina when foraging across larger areas and pursuing prey. It may have also been a factor that allowed Mosasaurus to thrive in the colder climates of locations such as Antarctica.

Sensory functions

Mosasaurus had relatively large eye sockets with large sclerotic rings occupying much of the sockets' diameter; the latter is correlated with eye size and suggests it had good vision. The eye sockets were located at the sides of the skull, which created a narrow field of binocular vision at around 28.5° but alternatively allowed excellent processing of a two-dimensional environment, such as the near-surface waters inhabited by Mosasaurus.

Brain casts made from fossils of Mosasaurus show that the olfactory bulb and vomeronasal organ, which both control the function of smell, are poorly developed and lack some structures in M. hoffmannii; this indicates the species had a poor sense of smell. In M. lemonnieri, these olfactory organs, although still small, are better developed and have some components lacking in M. hoffmannii. The lack of a strong sense of smell suggests that olfaction was not particularly important in Mosasaurus; instead, other senses like vision may have been more useful.

Feeding

Paleontologists generally agree that Mosasaurus was likely an active predator of a variety of marine animals. Fauna likely preyed upon by the genus include bony fish, sharks, cephalopods, birds, and marine reptiles such as other mosasaurs and turtles. It is unlikely Mosasaurus was a scavenger as it had a poor sense of smell. Mosasaurus was among the largest marine animals of its time, and with its large, robust cutting teeth, scientists believe larger members of the genus would have been able to handle virtually any animal. Lingham-Soliar (1995) suggested that Mosasaurus had a rather "savage" feeding behavior as demonstrated by large tooth marks on scutes of the giant sea turtle Allopleuron hoffmanni and fossils of re-healed fractured jaws in M. hoffmannii. The species likely hunted near the ocean surface as an ambush predator, using its large two-dimensionally adapted eyes to more effectively spot and capture prey. Chemical and structural data in the fossils of M. lemonnieri and M. conodon suggests they may have also hunted in deeper waters.

Carbon isotope studies on fossils of multiple M. hoffmannii individuals have found extremely low values of δ13C, the lowest in all mosasaurs for the largest individuals. Mosasaurs with lower δ13C values tended to occupy higher trophic levels, and one factor for this was dietary: a diet of prey rich in lipids such as sea turtles and other large marine reptiles can lower δ13C values. M. hoffmannii'''s low δ13C levels reinforces its likely position as an apex predator.

This fish was much longer than the length of the mosasaur's skull, which measured  in length, confirming that M. missouriensis consumed prey larger than its head by dismembering and consuming bits at a time. Due coexistence with other large mosasaurs like Prognathodon, which specialized in robust prey, M. missouriensis likely specialized more on prey best consumed using cutting-adapted teeth in an example of niche partitioning.Mosasaurus may have taught their offspring how to hunt, as supported by a fossil nautiloid Argonautilus catarinae with bite marks from two conspecific mosasaurs, one being from a juvenile and the other being from an adult. Analysis of the tooth marks by a 2014 study by Kauffman concluded that the mosasaurs were either Mosasaurus or Platecarpus. The positioning of both bite marks are at the direction the nautiloid's head would have been facing, indicating it was incapable of escaping and was thus already sick or dead during the attacks; it is possible this phenomenon was from a parent mosasaur teaching its offspring about cephalopods as an alternate source of prey and how to hunt one. An alternate explanation postulates the bite marks as from one individual mosasaur that lightly bit the nautiloid at first, then proceeded to bite again with greater force. However, there are differences in tooth spacing between both bites which indicate different jaw sizes.

Behavior and paleopathology
Intraspecific combat

There is fossil evidence that Mosasaurus engaged in aggressive and lethal combat with others of its kind. One partial skeleton of M. conodon bears multiple cuts, breaks, and punctures on various bones, particularly in the rear portions of the skull and neck, and a tooth from another M. conodon piercing through the quadrate bone. No injuries on the fossil show signs of healing, suggesting that the mosasaur was killed by its attacker by a fatal blow in the skull. Likewise, an M. missouriensis skeleton has a tooth from another M. missouriensis embedded in the lower jaw underneath the eye. In this case, there were signs of healing around the wound, implying survival of the incident. Takuya Konishi suggested an alternative cause of this example being head-biting behavior during courtship as seen in modern lizards.

Attacks by another Mosasaurus are a possible cause of physical pathologies in other skulls, but they could have instead arisen from other incidents like attempted biting on hard turtle shells. In 2004, Lingham-Soliar observed that if these injuries were indeed the result of an intraspecific attack, then there is a pattern of them concentrating in the skull region. Modern crocodiles commonly attack each other by grappling an opponent's head using their jaws, and Lingham-Soliar hypothesized that Mosasaurus employed similar head-grappling behavior during intraspecific combat. Many of the fossils with injuries possibly attributable to intraspecific combat are of juvenile or sub-adult Mosasaurus, leading to the possibility that attacks on smaller, weaker individuals may have been more common. However, the attacking mosasaurs of the M. conodon and M. missouriensis specimens were likely similar in size to the victims. In 2006, Schulp and colleagues speculated that Mosasaurus may have occasionally engaged in cannibalism as a result of intraspecific aggression.

Diseases

There are some M. hoffmannii jaws with evidence of infectious diseases as a result of physical injuries. Two examples include IRSNB R25 and IRSNB R27, both having fractures and other pathologies in their dentaries. IRSNB R25 preserves a complete fracture near the sixth tooth socket. Extensive amounts of bony callus almost overgrowing the tooth socket are present around the fracture along with various osteolytic cavities, abscess canals, damages to the trigeminal nerve, and inflamed erosions signifying severe bacterial infection. There are two finely ulcerated scratches on the bone callus, which may have developed as part of the healing process. IRSNB R27 has two fractures: one had almost fully healed and the other is an open fracture with nearby teeth broken off as a result. The fracture is covered with a nonunion formation of bony callus with shallow scratch marks and a large pit connected to an abscess canal. Lingham-Soliar described this pit as resembling a tooth mark from a possible attacking mosasaur. Both specimens show signs of deep bacterial infection alongside the fractures; some bacteria may have spread to nearby damaged teeth and caused tooth decay, which may have entered deeper tissue from prior post-traumatic or secondary infections. The dentaries ahead of the fractures in both specimens are in good condition, suggesting that the arteries and trigeminal nerves had not been damaged; if they were, those areas would have necrotized due to lack of blood. The dentaries' condition suggests that the species may have had an efficient process of immobilizing the fracture during healing, which helped prevent damage to vital blood vessels and nerves. This, along with signs of healing, indicates that the fractures were not imminently fatal.

In 2006, Schulp and colleagues published a study describing a quadrate of M. hoffmannii with multiple unnatural openings and an estimated  of tissue destroyed. This was likely a severe bone infection initiated by septic arthritis, which progressed to the point where a large portion of the quadrate was reduced to abscess. Extensive amounts of bone reparative tissue were also present, suggesting the infection and subsequent healing process may have progressed for a few months. This level of bone infection would have been tremendously painful and severely hampered the mosasaur's ability to use its jaws. The location of the infection may have also interfered with breathing. Considering how the individual was able to survive such conditions for an extended period of time, Schulp and colleagues speculated it switched to a foraging-type diet of soft-bodied prey like squid that could be swallowed whole to minimize jaw use. The cause of the infection remains unknown, but if it were a result of an intraspecific attack then it is possible one of the openings on the quadrate may have been the point of entry for an attacker's tooth from which the infection entered.

Avascular necrosis has been reported by many studies to be present in every examined specimen of M. lemonnieri and M. conodon. In examinations of M. conodon fossils from Alabama and New Jersey and M. lemonnieri fossils from Belgium, Rothschild and Martin in 2005 observed that the condition affected between 3-17% of the vertebrae in the mosasaurs' spines. Avascular necrosis is a common result of decompression illness; it involves bone damage caused by the formation of nitrogen bubbles from inhaled air decompressed during frequent deep-diving trips, or by intervals of repetitive diving and short breathing. This indicates that both Mosasaurus species may have either been habitual deep-divers or repetitive divers. Agnete Weinreich Carlsen considered it the simplest explanation that such conditions were a product of inadequate anatomical adaptation. Nevertheless, fossils of other mosasaurs with invariable avascular necrosis still exhibit substantial adaptations like eardrums that were well-protected from rapid changes in pressure.

Unnatural fusion of tail vertebrae has been documented in Mosasaurus, which occurs when the bones remodel themselves after damage from trauma or disease. A 2015 study by Rothschild and Everhart surveyed 15 Mosasaurus specimens from North America and Belgium and found cases of fused tail vertebrae in three of them. Two of these cases displayed irregular surface deformities around the fusion site caused by drainage of the vertebral sinuses, which is indicative of a bone infection. The causes of such infections are uncertain, but records of fused vertebrae in other mosasaurs suggest attacks by sharks and other predators as a possible candidate. The third case was determined to be caused by a form of arthritis based on the formation of smooth bridging between fused vertebrae.

Life history

It is likely that Mosasaurus was viviparous (giving live birth) like most modern mammals today. There is no evidence for live birth in Mosasaurus itself, but it is known in a number of other mosasaurs; examples include a skeleton of a pregnant Carsosaurus, a Plioplatecarpus fossil associated with fossils of two mosasaur embryos, and fossils of newborn Clidastes from pelagic (open ocean) deposits. Such fossil records, along with a total absence of any evidence suggesting external egg-based reproduction, indicates the likeliness of viviparity in Mosasaurus. Microanatomical studies on bones of juvenile Mosasaurus and related genera have found that their bone structures are comparable to adults. They do not exhibit the bone mass increase found in juvenile primitive mosasauroids to support buoyancy associated with a lifestyle in shallow water, implying that Mosasaurus was precocial: they were already efficient swimmers and lived fully functional lifestyles in open water at a very young age, and did not require nursery areas to raise their young. Some areas in Europe and South Dakota have yielded concentrated assemblages of juvenile M. hoffmannii, M. missouriensis and/or M. lemonnieri. These localities are all shallow ocean deposits, suggesting that juvenile Mosasaurus may still have lived in shallow waters.

Paleoecology
Distribution, ecosystem, and ecological impactMosasaurus had a transatlantic distribution, with its fossils having been found in marine deposits on both sides of the Atlantic Ocean. These localities include the Midwest and East Coast of the United States, Canada, Europe, Turkey, Russia, the Levant, the African coastline from Morocco to South Africa, Brazil, Argentina, and Antarctica. During the Late Cretaceous, these regions made up the three seaways inhabited by Mosasaurus: the Atlantic Ocean, the Western Interior Seaway, and the Mediterranean Tethys. Multiple oceanic climate zones encompassed the seaways, including tropical, subtropical, temperate, and subpolar climates. The wide range of oceanic climates yielded a large diversity of fauna that coexisted with Mosasaurus.

Mediterranean Tethys
The Mediterranean Tethys during the Maastrichtian stage was located in what is now Europe, Africa, and the Middle East. In recent studies, the confirmation of paleogeographical affinities extended this range to areas across the Atlantic including Brazil and the East Coast state of New Jersey. It is geographically subdivided into two biogeographic provinces that respectively include the northern and southern Tethyan margins. The two mosasaurs Mosasaurus and Prognathodon appear to have been the dominant taxa, being widespread and ecologically diversified throughout the seaway.

The northern Tethyan margin was located around the paleolatitudes of 30–40°N, consisting of what is now the European continent, Turkey, and New Jersey. At the time, Europe was a scattering of islands with most of the modern continental landmass being underwater. The margin provided a warm-temperate climate with habitats dominated by mosasaurs and sea turtles. M. hoffmannii and Prognathodon sectorius were the dominant species in the northern province. In certain areas such as Belgium, other Mosasaurus species like M. lemonnieri were instead the dominant species, where it's occurrences greatly outnumber those of other large mosasaurs. Other mosasaurs found in the European side of the northern Tethyan margin include smaller genera such as Halisaurus, Plioplatecarpus, and Platecarpus; the shell-crusher Carinodens; and larger mosasaurs of similar trophic levels including Tylosaurus bernardi and four other species of Prognathodon. Sea turtles such as Allopleurodon hoffmanni and Glyptochelone suickerbuycki were also prevalent in the area and other marine reptiles including indeterminate elasmosaurs have been occasionally found. Marine reptile assemblages in the New Jersey region of the province are generally equivalent with those in Europe; the mosasaur faunae are quite similar but exclude M. lemonnieri, Carinodens, Tylosaurus, and certain species of Halisaurus and Prognathodon. In addition, they exclusively feature M. conodon, Halisaurus platyspondylus and Prognathodon rapax. Many types of sharks such as Squalicorax, Cretalamna, Serratolamna, and sand sharks, as well as bony fish such as Cimolichthys, the saber-toothed herring Enchodus, and the swordfish-like Protosphyraena are represented in the northern Tethyan margin.

The southern Tethyan margin was located along the equator between 20°N and 20°S, resulting in warmer tropical climates. Seabeds bordering the cratons in Africa and Arabia and extending to the Levant and Brazil provided vast shallow marine environments. These environments were dominated by mosasaurs and marine side-necked turtles. Of the mosasaurs, Globidens phosphaticus is the characteristic species of the southern province; in the African and Arabian domain, Halisaurus arambourgi and Platecarpus ptychodon were also common mosasaurs alongside Globidens. Mosasaurus was not well-represented: the distribution of M. beaugei was restricted to Morocco and Brazil and isolated teeth from Syria suggested a possible presence of M. lemonnieri, although M. hoffmannii also had some presence throughout the province. Other mosasaurs from the southern Tethyan margin include the enigmatic Goronyosaurus, the shell-crushers Igdamanosaurus and Carinodens, Eremiasaurus, four other species of Prognathodon, and various other species of Halisaurus. Other marine reptiles such as the marine monitor lizard Pachyvaranus and the sea snake Palaeophis are known there. Aside from Zarafasaura in Morocco, plesiosaurs were scarce. As a tropical area, bony fish such as Enchodus and Stratodus and various sharks were common throughout the southern Tethyan margin.

Western Interior Seaway

Many of the earliest fossils of Mosasaurus were found in Campanian stage deposits in North America, including the Western Interior Seaway, an inland sea which once flowed through what is now the central United States and Canada, and connected the Arctic Ocean to the modern-day Gulf of Mexico. Extensive drainage from the neighboring continents, Appalachia and Laramidia, brought in vast amounts of sediment. Together with the formation of a nutrient-rich deepwater mass from the mixing of continental freshwater, Arctic waters from the north, and warmer saline Tethyan waters from the south, this created a warm and productive seaway that supported a rich diversity of marine life.

The biogeography of the region has been subdivided into two Interior Subprovinces characterized by different climates and faunal structures, and their borders are separated in modern-day Kansas. The oceanic climate of the Northern Interior Subprovince was likely a cool temperate one, while the Southern Interior Subprovince had warm temperate to subtropical climates. The fossil assemblages throughout these regions suggest a complete faunal turnover when M. missouriensis and M. conodon appeared at 79.5 Ma, indicating that the presence of Mosasaurus in the Western Interior Seaway had a profound impact on the restructuring of marine ecosystems. The faunal structure of both provinces was generally much more diverse prior to the appearance of Mosasaurus, during a faunal stage known as the Niobraran Age, than it was during the following Navesinkan Age.

In what is now Alabama within the Southern Interior Subprovince, most of the key genera including sharks like Cretoxyrhina and the mosasaurs Clidastes, Tylosaurus, Globidens, Halisaurus, and Platecarpus disappeared and were replaced by Mosasaurus. During the Navesinkan Age, Mosasaurus dominated the whole region, accounting for around two-thirds of all mosasaur diversity with Plioplatecarpus and Prognathodon sharing the remaining third. The Northern Interior Subprovince also saw a restructuring of mosasaur assemblages, characterized by the disappearance of mosasaurs like Platecarpus and their replacement by Mosasaurus and Plioplatecarpus. Some Niobraran genera such as Tylosaurus, Cretoxyrhina, hesperornithids, and plesiosaurs including elasmosaurs such as Terminonatator and polycotylids like Dolichorhynchops maintained their presence until around the end of the Campanian, during which the entire Western Interior Seaway started receding from the north. Mosasaurus continued to be the dominant genus in the seaway until the end of the Navesinkan Age at the end of the Cretaceous. Contemporaneous fauna included sea turtles such as Protostega and Archelon; many species of sea birds including Baptornis, Ichthyornis, and Halimornis; sharks such as the mackerel sharks Cretalamna, Squalicorax, Pseudocorax, and Serratolamna, the goblin shark Scapanorhynchus, the sand tiger Odontaspis, and the sawfish-like Ischyrhiza; and bony fish such as Enchodus, Protosphyraena, Stratodus, and the ichthyodectids Xiphactinus and Saurodon.

AntarcticaMosasaurus is known from late Maastrichtian deposits in the Antarctic Peninsula, specifically the López de Bertodano Formation in Seymour Island. Mosasaurus appears to be the most diverse mosasaur in the Maastrichtian Antarctica. At least two species of Mosasaurus have been described, but the true number of species is unknown as remains are often fragmentary and specimens are described in open nomenclature. These species include one comparable with M. lemonnieri, and another that appears to be closely related to M. hoffmannii. M. sp. has also been described. However, it is possible that such specimens may actually represent Moanasaurus, although this depends on the outcome of a pending revision of the genus. At least four other mosasaur genera have been reported in Antarctica, including Plioplatecarpus, the mosasaurines Moanasaurus and Liodon, and Kaikaifilu. The validity of some of these genera is disputed as they are primarily based on isolated teeth. Prognathodon and Globidens are also expected to be present based on distribution trends of both genera, although conclusive fossils have yet to be found. Other Antarctic marine reptiles included elasmosaurid plesiosaurs like Aristonectes and another indeterminate elasmosaurid. The fish assemblage of the López de Bertodano Formation was dominated by Enchodus and ichthyodectiformes.

Habitat preference

Known fossils of Mosasaurus have typically been recovered from deposits representing nearshore habitats during the Cretaceous period, with some fossils coming from deeper-water deposits. Changing temperatures and an abundance in marine life were characteristic of these localities. The morphological build of M. hoffmannii, nevertheless, was best adapted for a pelagic surface lifestyle.

δ13C is also correlated with a marine animal's feeding habitat as isotope levels deplete when habitat is farther from the shoreline, so some scientists interpreted isotope levels as a proxy for habitat preference. Separate studies involving multiple Mosasaurus specimens have yielded consistently low δ13C levels of tooth enamel, indicating that Mosasaurus fed in more offshore or open waters. It has been pointed out how δ13C can be influenced by other factors in an animal's lifestyle, such as diet and diving behavior. To account for this, a 2014 study by T. Lynn Harrell Jr. and Alberto Perez-Huerta examined the concentration ratios of neodymium, gadolinium, and ytterbium in M. hoffmannii and Mosasaurus sp. fossils from Alabama, the Demopolis Chalk, and the Hornerstown Formation. Previous studies demonstrated that ratios of these three elements can act as a proxy for relative ocean depth of a fossil during early diagenesis without interference from biological processes, with each of the three elements signifying either shallow, deep, or fresh waters.

Interspecific competitionMosasaurus lived alongside other large predatory mosasaurs also considered apex predators, most prominent among them being the tylosaurines and Prognathodon. These three mosasaurs preyed on similar animals such as marine reptiles.

A study published in 2013 by Schulp and colleagues specifically tested how mosasaurs such as M. hoffmannii and P. saturator were able to coexist in the same localities through δ13C analysis. The scientists utilized an interpretation that differences in isotope values can help explain the level of resource partitioning because it is influenced by multiple environmental factors such as lifestyle, diet, and habitat preference. Comparisons between the δ13C levels in multiple teeth of M. hoffmannii and P. saturator from the Maastrichtian-age Maastricht Formation showed that while there was some convergence between certain specimens, the average δ13C values between the two species were on average different. This is one indication of niche partitioning, where the two mosasaur genera likely foraged in different habitats or had different specific diets to coexist without direct competitive conflict. The teeth of P. saturator are much more robust than those of M. hoffmannii and were specifically equipped for preying on robust prey like turtles. While M. hoffmannii also preyed on turtles, its teeth were built to handle a wider range of prey less suited for P. saturator.

Another case of presumed niche partitioning between Mosasaurus and Prognathodon from the Bearpaw Formation in Alberta was documented in a 2014 study by Konishi and colleagues. The study found a dietary divide between M. missouriensis and Prognathodon overtoni based on stomach contents. Stomach contents of P. overtoni included turtles and ammonites, providing another example of a diet specialized for harder prey. In contrast, M. missouriensis had stomach contents consisting of fish, indicative of a diet specialized in softer prey. It was hypothesized that these adaptations helped maintain resource partitioning between the two mosasaurs.

Nevertheless, competitive engagement evidently could not be entirely avoided. There is also evidence of aggressive interspecific combat between Mosasaurus and other large mosasaur species. This is shown from a fossil skull of a subadult M. hoffmannii with fractures caused by a massive concentrated blow to the braincase; Lingham-Soliar (1998) argued that this blow was dealt by a ramming attack by Tylosaurus bernardi, as the formation of the fractures were characteristic of a coordinated strike (and not an accident or fossilization damage), and T. bernardi was the only known coexisting animal likely capable of causing such damage, using its robust arrow-like elongated snout. This sort of attack has been compared to the defensive behavior of bottlenose dolphins using their beaks to kill or repel lemon sharks, and it has been speculated that T. bernardi dealt the offensive attack via an ambush on an unsuspecting Mosasaurus.

Extinction

By the end of the Cretaceous, mosasaurs were at the height of their evolutionary radiation, and their extinction was a sudden event. During the late Maastrichtian, global sea levels dropped, draining the continents of their nutrient-rich seaways and altering circulation and nutrient patterns, and reducing the number of available habitats for Mosasaurus. The genus adapted by accessing new habitats in more open waters. The last fossils of Mosasaurus, which include those of M. hoffmannii and indeterminate species, occur up to the Cretaceous-Paleogene boundary (K-Pg boundary). The demise of the genus was likely a result of the Cretaceous-Paleogene extinction event which also wiped out the non-avian dinosaurs. Fossil vertebrae from the layer were found with fractures formed after death. The layer was likely deposited as a tsunamite, alternatively nicknamed the "Cretaceous cocktail deposit". This formed through a combination of catastrophic seismic and geological disturbances, mega-hurricanes, and giant tsunamis caused by the impact of the Chicxulub asteroid that catalyzed the K-Pg extinction event. As well as physical destruction, the impact also blocked out sunlight leading to a collapse of marine food webs. Any Mosasaurus surviving the immediate cataclysms by taking refuge in deeper waters would have died out due to starvation from a loss of prey.

One enigmatic occurrence of Mosasaurus sp. fossils is in the Hornerstown Formation, a deposit typically dated to be from the Paleocene Danian age, which was immediately after the Maastrichtian age. The fossils were found in association with fossils of Squalicorax, Enchodus, and various ammonites within a uniquely fossil-rich bed at the base of the Hornerstown Formation known as the Main Fossiliferous Layer. This does not mean Mosasaurus and its associated fauna survived the K-Pg extinction. According to one hypothesis, the fossils may have originated from an earlier Cretaceous deposit and were reworked into the Paleocene formation during its early deposition. Evidence of reworking typically comes from fossils worn down due to further erosion during their exposure at the time of redeposition. Many of the Mosasaurus fossils from the Main Fossiliferous Layer consist of isolated bones commonly abraded and worn, but the layer also yielded better-preserved Mosasaurus remains. Another explanation suggests the Main Fossiliferous Layer is a Maastrichtian time-averaged remanié deposit, which means it originated from a Cretaceous deposit with winnowed low-sediment conditions. A third hypothesis proposes that the layer is a lag deposit of Cretaceous sediments forced out by a strong impact by a tsunami, and what remained was subsequently refilled with Cenozoic fossils.

 See also 

 Plotosaurus Eremiasaurus Moanasaurus''

Notes

References

External links

 
 
Oceans of Kansas

Mosasaurines
Mosasaurs of North America
Mosasaurs of Europe
Fossil taxa described in 1822
Taxa named by William Conybeare
Demopolis Chalk
Mooreville Chalk
Apex predators
Fossils of the Netherlands